David Newsom (born March 10, 1962) is an American actor, producer and fine-art photographer. He is best known for his various critically acclaimed appearances in American television and for his work in 2005 and 2006 with Viggo Mortensen and Perceval Press.

Career

Photography
Along with film and TV work, Newsom is a long-time photographer with and emphasis on fine art photography. In 2005, he collaborated with Viggo Mortensen to create a photo journal called Skip (Newsom's eldest brother's nickname) which was then published by Mortensen's Perceval Press. In June 2006, with Viggo Mortensen, Lindsay Brice and Stanley Milstein, Newsom anchored a successful group photographic show entitled "Four Tales from Perceval".

In June–July 2007, Newsom held his first comprehensive one man show titled, "Three Miles of Idaho" at DCA Fine Art in Santa Monica, CA.

Film and television
In 2005, Newsom began producing movies, starting with his first short film Mother, written and directed by Sian Heder.

In April 2006, "Mother" won the Grand Jury Award for Best Narrative Short at the Florida Film Festival, a victory which automatically qualified the film for a potential Academy Award nomination. Mother was also selected for the May 2006 Cinefondation Competition of the Cannes Film Festival, where it won third place in a field of 18 films from around the globe. The film was then selected for many other festivals, including the prestigious Seattle International Film Festival, where it received the "2006 Short Film: Narrative Special Jury Prize". "Mother" continues to play globally and recently took the Grand Jury Award-Narrative Shorts at the Oxford Film Festival.

In early 2007, Newsom and Heder partnered with The Mark Gordon Company and are in pre-production on the feature film, "Tallulah".

Newsom also produced Open Your Eyes for director Susan Cohen in the summer of 2007. Cohen, a recipient of a 2007 AFI Directing Workshop for Women grant, wrote "OYE" as a tribute to the women she had known who battled and lived with cancer. In May, 2008, "Open Your Eyes" was awarded the AFI "Jean Picker Firstenburg Award of Excellence".

In recent years, Newsom has been busy producing adventure/reality television for such networks as: Discovery Channel, Nat Geo and History.

From 2010 to 2011, he was a field producer,  cameraman and story producer for Discovery's "DEADLIEST CATCH", Season 7.

In fall of 2011, he was a field producer/cameraman for Nat Geo's "Wild Justice", seasons 2 and 3.

In January 2012, he teamed up with Undertow Films and began as senior producer on a new series for History Channel, about the largest study of sharks ever conducted off the coast of South Africa.

Habitat garden consultation
In 2014, when his daughter was born, Newsom transformed his lifeless yard into a garden providing habitat for wildlife. He started a non-profit called the Wild Yards Project to inspire people across the country to create habitat where they live and help them get the tools they need to get it done. His goal is for the planet to remain habitable for children. He does habitat consultation in northeast LA and helps design and install gardens.

Personal life
Newsom was born in North Caldwell, New Jersey to a mother who managed an employment agency and an investor father. He lives in Los Angeles with his wife, writer/director Sian Heder, with whom he has two children. Newsom has a degree in film production from Ithaca College. He has worked in the past as a band singer, alternative newspaper editor, writer, waiter, delivery man, blasting worker, beer bottler, fence installer, dish washer, and in film production as well as set construction.

Filmography

Actor

Film

Television

References

External links

David Newsom's Official Website
David Newsom at MySpace
Detailed Interview with "ReadySteadyBook"

1962 births
American male film actors
American male television actors
Ithaca College alumni
Living people
People from North Caldwell, New Jersey
Fine art photographers